The Tournament of Death is an annual professional wrestling tournament organized by Combat Zone Wrestling since 2002, during which a number of wrestlers compete in various deathmatches in what are mostly single-elimination tournaments similar to World Wrestling Entertainment's King of the Ring tournament. These tournaments include the typical hardcore weapons used in deathmatch wrestling such as barbed wire, nails, thumbtacks, fire, tables, ladders, and light tubes, and are known for all their large amounts of blood loss.

Notable entrants in the Tournament of Death have included Jimmy Havoc, Ian Rotten, Corporal Robinson, Nick Mondo, Ruckus, Eddie Kingston, Jon Moxley, Sami Callihan, and Mickie Knuckles (the only female entrant to date). Many of the cards have also included non-tournament matches featuring top independent wrestlers such as Sonjay Dutt, Nick Berk, Trent Acid, The Blackout and B-Boy.

Winners

1The finals between Thumbtack Jack and Nick Gage was ruled a no-contest due to Gage suffering an injury that required emergency surgery. Zandig won an Ultraviolent Battle Royal. After the match, Zandig awarded the win to Thumbtack Jack.

Zandig's Ultraviolent Tournament of Death
August 31, 2002 saw the first annual CZW Tournament of Death. The event was billed as Zandig's Ultraviolent Tournament of Death due to a storyline of John Zandig losing ownership of CZW to Lobo, thus promoting his own deathmatch tournament. It was held in Dover, Delaware. Non-tournament matches included Green Phantom & Arsenal defeating The Hardcore Ninjaz and a tag scramble match which saw The Backseat Boyz defeat Derek Frasier & Sonjay Dutt, Jon Dahmer & Towel Boy and The New School, as well as a Three Way Dance in which Ruckus defeated Justice Pain and Nick Berk. On winning the tournament, Wifebeater became the CZW Death Match Champion, however, the title was vacated on November 9, 2002, upon his retirement.

Competitors

Round one
 Zandig vs. Nate Hatred went to a no contest - Barbed Wire Boards†
 The Messiah def. Adam Flash 
 Wifebeater def. Necro Butcher - Staple Gun & Mousetraps & Falls Count Anywhere
 Nick Gage def. Toby Klein - Barbed Wire Boards & Wooden Strips with Nails
 Sick Nick Mondo def. Homeless Jimmy - Falls Count Anywhere

Semi finals
 Wifebeater def. Nick Gage - Panes of Glass Deathmatch
 Nick Mondo def. The Messiah - Fans Bring The Weapons

Final
 Wifebeater def. Nick Mondo - 200 Light Tubes and Barbed Wire Ropes Deathmatch

Note
† - Both men were attacked by Lobo, Rockin Rebel, Z-Barr, Adam Flash, & Danny Rose. Lobo then entered Flash into the tournament and challenged anyone in the locker room. The Messiah returned and defeated Flash with Carlito's Way

Ultraviolent Tournament of Death II
July 26, 2003 saw the second CZW Tournament of Death, again held in Dover, Delaware. Non-tournament matches included Trent Acid pinning Z-Barr, Johnny Kashmere pinning Nick Berk, and a tag match in which B-Boy & Messiah defeated Sonjay Dutt & Ruckus. Although Nick Mondo won the tournament, due to the injuries he sustained he had to vacate his CZW Iron Man Championship afterwards. This event would also be the last he wrestled in.

Competitors

Round one
 Zandig def. Nate Webb - Panes of Glass Match
 Nick Mondo def. JC Bailey - Light Tubes & Ladders Match
 Necro Butcher def. Corporal Robinson - 4 Corners of Pain Match
 Ian Rotten def. Nick Gage - Barbed Wire Boards & Light Tube Table Match

Semi finals
 Ian Rotten def. Necro Butcher - Fans Bring The Weapons Match
 Nick Mondo def. Zandig - 2/3 Light Tube Log Cabins Match

Final
 "Sick" Nick Mondo def. Ian Rotten - Barbed Wire Ropes, 200 Light Tubes Match

Ultraviolent Tournament of Death III: Banned... My Ass
On July 24, 2004, the third CZW Tournament of Death (subtitled Banned... My Ass) was held in Smyrna, Delaware. This year there were no non-tournament matches held, however, the number of entrants rose from eight to twelve (including representatives of Canada's International Wrestling Syndicate).

Competitors

↑ Ruckus entered as a substitute for John Zandig

Round one
 Arsenal def. Evil Ninja #2 - 2/3 Light Tube Log Cabins Match
 Nick Gage def. Ruckus - Barbed Wire Boards Match
 Wifebeater def. Mad Man Pondo - Fans Bring the Weapons Match
 SeXXXy Eddy def. Ian Knoxx - Thumbtacks, Carpet Strips & Carpet Strip Board Match
 Necro Butcher def. The Green Phantom - Fans Bring the Weapons Match
 JC Bailey def. Chri$ Ca$h - Light Tubes & Ladders Match

Semi finals
 SeXXXy Eddy def. Arsenal - Light Tube Ropes & Light Tube Corners Match‡
 Wifebeater def. JC Bailey - Fans Bring the Weapons Match
 Necro Butcher def. Nick Gage - Panes of Glass Match

Final
 Wifebeater def. Necro Butcher - Barbed Wire Ropes, 200 Light Tubes, Fans Bring The Weapons, Light Tube Cage Part, Barbed Wire Cage Part, and Falls Count Anywhere Double Hell Death Match (Tons of all weapons, barbed wire ropes, cage parts covered in light tubes, cage parts covered in barbed wire, and lots more)
‡ SeXXXy Eddy was taken to hospital following the match after suffering a wound to the arm, and so could not compete in the final

Tournament of Death IV: Explicit Content
On July 30, 2005, the fourth CZW Tournament of Death took place in New Castle, Delaware. This year's show included a non-tournament Ultraviolent Student Battle Royal, won by WHACKS. As well as featuring Gypsy Joe as special guest referee for the tournament final. After the final, as Necro Butcher had won the finals, he was awarded the CZW Ultraviolent Underground Championship.

Competitors in the Ultraviolent Student Battle Royal

Competitors

↑ Robbie Mireno and Eddie Kingston entered as one, losing to Zandig in a first round handicap match Joker came out and help Zandig

Round one
 JC Bailey def. SeXXXy Eddy - Barbed Wire Madness Match
 Toby Klein def. Mad Man Pondo - Light Tube Ropes & Light Tube Corners Match
 Brain Damage def. Beef Wellighton - 2/3 Ultraviolent Tables Match
 Necro Butcher def. Ian Rotten - Home Run Derby Deathmatch
 Nick Gage def. Nate Webb - Ladders And Light Tubes Match
 Zandig def. Robbie Mireno and Eddie Kingston - Fans Bring The Weapons Match*

Semi finals
 Necro Butcher def. Brain Damage - Fans Bring The Weapons Match
 Zandig def. Toby Klein - 2 Out of 3 Light Tube Log Cabins Match
 Nick Gage def. JC Bailey - Panes Of Glass Match

Final
 Necro Butcher def. Zandig and Nick Gage - Ultraviolent Boxes, Barbed Wire Canvas, Light Tubes, Squared Circle Of Fear, & Whatever The Fuck Is Left Elimination Death Match

Tournament of Death V
The fifth CZW Tournament of Death was held in Smyrna, Delaware on July 29, 2006. The format changed slightly for this show, with the first round matches being three-way elimination matches, the second round matches being 4-way double elimination matches, and the final being a single elimination 4-way match. Non-tournament matches included The Blackout (Ruckus & Robbie Mireno) defeating Drew Gulak & Jimmy Dream, and Kylie defeating former ECW star Chad Austin.

Competitors

Round one
 Brandon Prophet and Nick Gage elim. Andy Sumner - Barbed Wire Ropes & Light Tubes Match
 JC Bailey and Drake Younger elim. Lobo - Light Tubes & Barbed Wire Spider Webs Match
 Brain Damage and Necro Butcher elim. Toby Klein - Barbed Wire Ropes, Fans Bring The Weapons Match
 Danny Havoc and D. J. Hyde elim. John Zandig - Barbed Wire Ropes, Barbed Wire Boards & Panes Of Glass Match

Semi finals
 Nick Gage and Brain Damage elim. Brandon Prophet and Necro Butcher - Fans Bring The Weapons Match
 Drake Younger and JC Bailey elim. D. J. Hyde and Danny Havoc - Light Tubes, Ladders & Lemons Match

Final
 Nick Gage def. Brain Damage, Drake Younger and JC Bailey - Light Tubes, Panes of Glass & Fans Bring The Weapons Match

Tournament of Death VI
Tournament of Death VI returned to Smyrna, Delaware on June 9, 2007. This was a 12-man tournament, with non-tournament matches including Team AnDrew (Andy Sumner & Drew Gulak) defeating the then CZW World Tag Team Champions The Blackout (Ruckus & Sabian) in a non-title match.

Competitors

Round one
 Danny Havoc def. Scotty Vortekz - Light Tubes, Ladders, & Light Tube Log Cabin Match
 Insane Lane def. Freakshow - Home Run Derby Match
 D. J. Hyde (with Maven Bentley) def. Mad Man Pondo - Shattered Dreams Match
 Brain Damage (with Maven Bentley) def. Toby Klein (with Billy Graham) - Barbed Wire Boards, Fans Bring the Weapons Match
 Drake Younger def. Diehard Dustin Lee - Light Tubes & Light Tube Table Match
 Necro Butcher def. John Zandig† - No Rope Barbed Wire, Barbed Wire Boards, Panes of Glass & Barbed Wire Spider Web Match

† Necro Butcher was originally scheduled to face Mitch Ryder but he could not make it due to travel issues

Semi finals
 Drake Younger def. Danny Havoc and D. J. Hyde - 3-Way Weedwhackers Elimination Match
 Brain Damage def. Insane Lane and Necro Butcher - Fans Bring the Weapons Match

Final
 Drake Younger def. Brain Damage - Divide & Conquer 200 Light Tubes and Lumberjacks Deathmatch

Tournament of Death: Fast Forward
Tournament of Death: Fast Forward took place September 15, 2007. It was a mini-TOD for the vacant Ultraviolent Underground title.

Competitors

First round
Brain Damage def. Hellaware Assassin in a Weapons Match
Scotty Vortekz def. Danny Demanto in a 4 Corners of Pain Match
Danny Havoc def. Diehard Dustin Lee in a Barbed Wire Tables, Lightubes, and Staple Gun Match
JC Bailey def. Drake Younger in a Pane of Glass and Lightubes Match

Final round
Brain Damage def. Scotty Vortez, Danny Havoc, and JC Bailey in an Ultraviolent Underground Title Match 4 Way Elimination - Fans Brings The Weapons, Thumbtacks Fire and Ultraviolent Staple Gun Death Match

Tournament of Death VII
Tournament of Death VII took place for the third year in a row in Smyrna, Delaware, on May 17, 2008, and marked the first time a female competitor had entered the tournament. It included a non-tournament match between The Blackout (Ruckus & Sabian) and Joe Gacy & Alex Colon. Attendance was reported as 527.

Competitors

Round one
 Pinkie Sanchez def. Danny Demanto - Ladder & Light Tubes Match
 Scotty Vortekz def. Mickie Knuckles - Light Tubes Match
 WHACKS def. Dustin Lee - Barbed Wire Boards & Light Tubes Match
 D. J. Hyde def. Andy Sumner - Falls Count Anywhere Match
 Nick Gage vs. Drake Younger led to a no-contest after interference from Drew Blood and Devon Moore, leading to A VERY Bloody Match
 Nick Gage & Drake Younger def. Drew Blood & Devon Moore - Panes of Glass Match
 Greg Excellent def. Ryan McBride - Barbed Wire Madness Match
 Danny Havoc def. Ram - Light Tube Bundles Match↑
↑Ram was Mickey Rourke's stunt double during the taping of "The Wrestler" movie and served as Necro Butcher's stunt double in this match

Semi finals
 Scotty Vortekz and Drake Younger def. D. J. Hyde and WHACKS - Fish Hook Death Match
 Nick Gage and Danny Havoc def. Greg Excellent and Pinkie Sanchez - Fans Bring The Weapons Match

Final
 Danny Havoc def. Nick Gage, Scotty Vortekz and Drake Younger - No Rope Barbed Wire, Barbed Wire Board, Barbed Wire Table, Panes of Glass, 200 Light Tubes Match

Tournament of Death VIII
Tournament of Death VIII took place on June 6, 2009, at the Ultraviolent Underground in Townsend, Delaware. Attendance was around 800.

Competitors

First round
 Nick Gage def. Deranged - Fire Death Match (No Ropes Flaming Barbed Wire)
 Jon Moxley def. Brain Damage - Dining Room Deathmatch (Tables, Chairs, Silverware, and more)
 WHACKS def. Toby Klein - Barbed Wire Boards & Light Tube Bundles Match
 Danny Havoc def. Dysfunction - Panes of Glass Death Match (Barbed Wire Glass, Light Tube Glass & Panes of Glass)
 Scotty Vortekz def. xOMGx and Drake Younger - Thumbtack Kickpads Match
 Thumbtack Jack def. D. J. Hyde - Jack In The Box Death Match (Panes of Glass, Cinder Blocks, Light Tubes, Syringes, & more)

Semi-final round
 Nick Gage def. Jon Moxley and Scotty Vortekz - Fans Bring The Weapons Match
 Thumbtack Jack def. WHACKS and Danny Havoc - Fans Bring The Weapons Match

Final round
 Thumbtack Jack vs. Nick Gage went to a no contest. Gage was seriously cut under his armpit after being thrown through lighttubes which were propped between the ropes and had to be air lifted out for emergency surgery - "200 Light Tubes, Panes of Glass, and All the Other Shit in the Back We Could Find" deathmatch
 Zandig def. Thumbtack Jack, Jon Moxley, Sami Callihan, D. J. Hyde, Brain Damage, Dysfunction, xOMGx, Drake Younger, and Scotty Vortekz - Ultraviolent Battle Royal. After the match, Zandig awarded the win to Thumbtack Jack.

TOD Championship Defense @ BOTB 2009
D. J. Hyde def. Thumbtack Jack, Jon Moxley, and Danny Havoc

Tournament of Death: Rewind
Tournament of Death: Rewind took place on October 25, 2009, after being postponed due to weather issues from the day before, at the Ultraviolent Underground in Townsend, Delaware. The Ultraviolent Underground title was on the line throughout the tournament. Attendance was about 150.

Competitors
Nick Gage
Thumbtack Jack
John Zandig
Masada
Brain Damage
Jon Moxley
Sami Callihan
Danny Havoc

First round
 Sami Callihan def. Danny Havoc in a Caribbean Pits of Death Deathmatch (Caribbean Spider Web Style: Carpet Strips/Broken Glass, Barbed Wire/Broken Glass & Barbed Wire Light Tube Platform) to become the new Ultraviolent Underground champion
 Thumbtack Jack def. "Streetdog" Jon Moxley in a Four Corners of Fun Dog Collar Death Match (Lego Bricks, Staple Gun, Mouse Trap Board & Cinder Blocks)
 Masada def. Brain Damage in a New Age Texas Death Match
 Nick Gage def. Zandig in a Panes of Glass Match

Second round
 Thumbtack Jack def. Sami Callihan in a Transylvania Death Match (Light Tube Casket) to become the new Ultraviolent Underground champion
 Masada def. Nick Gage in a Home Run Derby Death Match

Finals
 Thumbtack Jack def. Masada In A House Of Pain Deathmatch (Barbed Wire Ropes, Light Tube Ropes, Cinder Blocks, Barbed Wire Platform & Home Run Derby Weapons)

Tournament of Death IX

Tournament of Death 9 was held on June 26, 2010, at the Ultraviolent Underground in Townsend, Delaware. Non Tournament matches were Brain Damage defeated Drake Younger in a "sit and hit" Tai Pei deathmatch and Sami Callihan and Joe Gacy defeated Greg Excellent and D. J. Hyde in an Ultraviolent Tag Team Fans Bring the Weapons Falls Count Anywhere Deathmatch. Attendance was around 1,000.

Competitors
Masada (wrestler)
Devon Moore
Abdullah Kobayashi
JC Bailey
Danny Havoc
Dysfunction
Nick Gage

Round one
 JC Bailey def. Danny Havoc in a Havoc's Happyland Death Match (Light Tube Bundles & Structures)†
 Abdullah Kobayashi def. Nick Gage in a Weapons of Mass Destruction Death Match (Kenzans and more)‡
 Scotty Vortekz def. Dysfunction in a Thumbtack Kickpads and Panes of Glass Death Match
 Masada def. Devon Moore in a Fans Bring the Weapons Death Match

Round two
 JC Bailey def. Abdullah Kobayashi in a 3 out of 5 Barbed wire board and Light Tube Log Cabin Death Match
 Scotty Vortekz def. Masada in a Boards of Death Deathmatch (Barbed Wire Boards Death Match with Light Tubes, Ladders, and many more)

Finals
 Scotty Vortekz def. JC Bailey Tables, Ladders, Light Tubes, and Anything Else Still Left in the Back Death Match

Tournament of Death vs. Gorefest
Tournament of Death vs. Gorefest was held on November 7, 2010, in Oberhausen, Germany. Non Tournament matches were Jon Moxley defeated Devon Moore in a match for the CZW World Heavyweight Title, Big van Walter defeated 2-Face in a match for the wXw World Heavyweight Title, Adam Cole, Drew Gulak, Karsten Beck & Blk Jeez defeat Zack Sabre Jr., Greg Excellent, Bernd Föhr & Rich Swann in an 8-man tag inter-promotional showcase, and Sami Callihan defeated Carnage. Attendance was around 356.

Competitors
Masada
Adam Polak
Drake Younger
D. J. Hyde
Danny Havoc
Jon Ryan
Nick Gage
Jimmy Havoc

Round one
 Jon Ryan defeats Danny Havoc in a Thumbtack Stuff Death match
 Drake Younger defeats D. J. Hyde in a Cinderblocks & Barbed Wire board Death match
 Masada defeats Jimmy Havoc in a Ultraviolent Tables Death match
 Nick Gage† defeats Adam Polak in a Polish Punishment Death Match

Round two
 Masada defeated Drake Younger in a 2/3 log Cabins Death match
 Nick Gage‡ defeated Jon Ryan in an Unlucky 13 Death match

Round three
 Nick Gage± defeated Masada in a No Ropes Barbed Wire Death match

Tournament of Death X
Tournament of Death X took place on June 25, 2011, at the Ultraviolent Underground in Townsend, Delaware. Non tournament action saw Devon Moore and Little Mondo lose to Philly's Most Wanted, and D. J. Hyde vs. Greg Excellent vs. Sami Callihan became Sami Callihan def. Greg Excellent the loser became DJ's slave.

Competitors
Masashi Takeda
Jaki Numazawa
Masada
Dysfunction
Necro Butcher
 "Bulldozer" Matt Tremont
Danny Havoc
Scotty Vortekz

Round 1
 Fans Bring the Weapons: Masada def. Dysfunction (10:10)
 Get Hit... With Shit Match (Water Jug Bats & Anything You Can Swing at Your Opponent): "Bulldozer" Matt Tremont def. Necro Butcher (15:33)
 Light Tube Celebration (Light Tube Bundles & Pits of Christmas Bulbs): Jaki Numazawa def. Danny Havoc (09:30)
 Barbed Wire Boards, Thumbtack Kickpads and Taipei Glass Death Match: Masashi Takeda def. Scotty Vortekz (09:20)

Round 2
 Kenzans, Whips and "Anything Else Whatever the Fuck We Can Find in the Back" Match: Masada def. "Bulldozer" Matt Tremont (14:49)
 Barbed Wire Boards, Light Tubes, and Thumbtacks Match: Masashi Takeda def. Jaki Numazawa (07:58)

Non-tournament matches
 Sami Callihan def. Greg Excellent (04:23)
 Philly's Most Wanted (Joker & BLK Jeez) def. Devon Moore & Rory Mondo (13:40)

Final round
 Barbed Wire Ropes, Light Tubes and Panes of Glass Match: Masada def. Masashi Takeda (14:00)

Tournament of Death XI
The tournament was held June 23, 2012 in Townsend, DE.

Competitors
Abdullah Kobayashi
Matt Tremont
Rory "Little" Mondo
Devon Moore
Drake Younger

Danny Havoc
"Mr. Showtime" Scot Summers
Masada

First round
Drunken Scaffold Match: Danny Havoc def. Devon Moore and 
Ultraviolent Ladders and Light Tubes Match: Drake Younger def. Rory Mondo
Panes of Glass Match: MASADA def. Scott Summers
 Light Tube Bundles and Ultraviolent Bats Match: Abdullah Kobayashi def. Matt Tremont

Non-tournament matches
Fans Bring the Weapons Match: 'Chainsaw' Joe Gacy def. Ryan Slater

Second round
Caribbean Spiderwebs of Death & Light Tubes Match: Drake Younger def. Danny Havoc
Big Japan Death Match (Nail Board, Kenzans and more): MASADA def. Abdullah Kobayashi

Finals
 Non-Sanctioned Ultraviolent Double Hell Death Match (No Ropes Barbed Wire, Barbed Wire Nets, Light Tubes ): MASADA def. Drake Younger

Tournament of Death: Europe
This tournament was held November 4, 2012 in Germany in front of an audience of 357. In non-tournament action Jay Skillet def. Karsten Beck taking Match 5 of the Jay Skillet Trial Series, OI4K def. Gridiron, Are$ def. Robert Dreissker, and Jonathan Gresham def. Alex Colon qualifying for the 2013 wXw 16 Carat Gold Tournament.

Competitors
Matt Tremont
Jimmy Havoc
D. J. Hyde
Mike Schwarz
Masada
Greg Excellent
Toby Blunt
Drake Younger

Round 1
 Light Tube Hell Death Match: Drake Younger def. Jimmy Havoc
 Ruhrpott Death Match: Matt Tremont def. Mike Schwarz
 Tables, Ladders & Chairs Match: D. J. Hyde def. Toby Blunt
Fans Bring the Weapons Match: Masada def. Greg Excellent

Finals
No Ropes Barbed Wire, 200 Light Tubes Elimination Death Match: Masada def. D. J. Hyde, Drake Younger and Matt Tremont.

Tournament of Death 12
Happened June 8, 2013 in Townsend, DE @ the Ultraviolent Underground. In Non- Tournament action Drake Younger defeated Devon Moore in a Scaffold Match, Drew Gulak vs. Chris Dickinson went to a no contest as both men attacked Masada, and Sami Callihan vs. Greg Excellent ended with D. J. Hyde getting a watermelon smashed over his head and was Callihan's last match in CZW.

Competitors:

Round 1
 Fans Bring the Weapons Dog Collar Match: Ron Mathis def. Joe Gacy
 Mummified in Barbed Wire Match: Danny Havoc def. Rory Mondo
 Ultraviolent Ladders Match: Scotty Vortekz def. Lucky tHURTeen
 International Panes of Glass: Takumi Tsukamoto def. D. J. Hyde

Round 2
 Fans Bring the Weapons Match: Scotty Vortekz def. Ron Mathis
 Light Tube Madness: Danny Havoc def. Takumi Tsukamoto

Round 3
 444 Light Tube Match: Danny Havoc def. Scotty Vortekz

Tournament of Death XIII
This event was held on June 14, 2014, and was cited as being a "BJW vs. CZW" show.

Competitors:
Jun Kasai
Danny Havoc
Aero Boy
MASADA
Jaki Numazawa
Matt Tremont
Masashi Takeda
Lucky 13

Round 1
 Fans Bring the Dildos Death Match (Dildo Ladder): Lucky 13 def. Jaki Numazawa
 Barbed Wire Madness Death Match: MASADA def. Aero Boy
 Ultraviolent Pits of Hell Death Match: Danny Havoc def. Masashi Takeda
 Light Tube Bundles Death Match: Jun Kasai def. Matt Tremont

Round 2
 Panes of Glass Death Match: MASADA def. Lucky 13
 Light Tubes, Gusset Plates and Razorboard Death Match: Jun Kasai def. Danny Havoc

Finals
 No Ropes Barbed Wire, Light Tube Bundles & Scaffold Death Match: Jun Kasai def. MASADA

Tournament of Death 14
The 14th annual Tournament of Death took place on June 13, 2015, at the Ultraviolent Underground. Non tournament matches had Dave Crist def. Devon Moore in an Scaffold Match and Lucky tHURTeen def. Eric Ryan in a LOL (Ladders, Orange Sacks and Legos) Match.

Announced Competitors:

Round one
 Fans Bring The Weapons Match: Conor Claxton def. D. J. Hyde & Nick Gage
 Pits & Strips Match: Matt Tremont def. Josh Crane
 Barbed Wire Boards Match: Jake Crist def. Ron Mathis
 Light Tube Bundles & Ultraviolent Boards Match: Danny Havoc def. Rickey Shane Page

Round two
Carsenogenic Carnage: Matt Tremont def. Danny Havoc
Panes of Glass: Conor Claxton def. Jake Crist

Finals
No Ropes Barbed Wire, Barbed Wire Death Webs & Panes of Glass Match: Matt Tremont def. Conor Claxton

Tournament of Death XV
The 15th annual Tournament of Death took place on June 11, 2016, at the Ultraviolent Underground. Eat The Turnbuckle, the band of Dojo War's wrestler Shlak, played songs during Intermission of the event.
This Tournament of Death was featured in the Vice documentary "Bloodlust: Tournament of Death".

Announced Competitors:

Non-tournament matches
 Rockstar Death Match: Aaron Williams defeats Ron Mathis
 Devon Moore Invitational Scaffold Match: Dale Patricks Vs. Devon Moore - No Contest
 Tag Team Tornado Scaffold Match: Nation Of Intoxication (Devon Moore & Lucky 13) defeats Dale Patricks and G-Raver
 Panes Of Glass Match: Josh Crane defeats D. J. Hyde

Round one
 Fans Bring the Weapons/Falls Count Anywhere Match Match: Rickey Shane Page defeats Tim Donst
 Barbed Wire Madness Match: Conor Claxton defeats Masada
 Lightubes Bundles Match: Alex Colon defeats Danny Havoc
 Home Run Derby Match: Matt Tremont defeats Jeff Cannonball

Round two
 Barefoot Rites of Passage Match: Rickey Shane Page defeats Conor Claxton
 Sharp Shit Death Match: Matt Tremont defeats Alex Colon

Finals
 Ring of Fire and Wire Deathmatch: Rickey Shane Page defeats Matt Tremont

Tournament of Death 16
The 16th annual Tournament of Death took place June 10, 2017. This tournament marked the debut Tournament of Death for John Wayne Murdoch, Shlak, G-Raver and Clint Margera. This is also the first mainstream Tournament of Death Jimmy Havoc competed in, having wrestled in ToD Europe as a member of Westside Xtreme Wrestling.

Non-tournament match
Four Corners Of Pain: Dan O'Hare defeated George Gatton and Jimmy Lloyd and Kit Osbourne
Fans Bring The Weapons Match: Matt Tremont defeated Mad Man Pondo
Scaffold Match: Danny Havoc and Alex Colon defeated Notorious Inc (Devon Moore/Kit Osbourne and Drew Blood)

First round
Pain in the Glass Match: Jimmy Havoc defeated John Wayne Murdoch and Rickey Shane Page
Lightubes and Cinder Blocks Death Match: Jeff Cannonball defeated G-Raver
Doorway To Hell Death Match: Masada defeated Shlak
Barbed Wire Craziness Death Match: Conor Claxton defeated Clint Margera

Round two
 Summertime Fun Death Match: Conor Claxton defeated Jeff Cannonball
 Light Tubes Treachery Match: Jimmy Havoc defeated Masada

Finals
 No Ropes, No Canvas, Barbed Wire & Light Tube Deathmatch Match: Jimmy Havoc defeated Conor Claxton

Tournament of Death 17
The 17th annual Tournament of Death took place June 9, 2018.

Non-tournament match
Fans Bring The Weapons Match: Matt Tremont def. Jeff Cannonball and Toby Klein

First round
Blocks, Bats and Bundles Elimination Death Match: Jimmy Lloyd def. Casanova Valentine, SHLAK, Stockade and G-Raver.
4 Corners of Pain Elimination Death Match: Mance Warner def. Dale Patricks and Josh Crane
Lotsa Lotsa Light Tubes Death Match: Rickey Shane Page Page def. Drew Parker
4 Corners of Pain & Barbed Wire Madness Elimination Death Match: Brandon Kirk def. Conor Claxton and Dan O'Hare and Kit Osbourne

Round two
Saw Death Match: Jimmy Lloyd def. Mance Warner
Death Match: Rickey Shane Page Page def. Brandon Kirk

Finals
Barbed Wire No Ropes Lightube Death Match: Jimmy Lloyd def. Rickey Shane Page

Tournament of Death 18
The 18th annual Tournament of Death took place June 22, 2019.

Non-tournament matches
Home Run Derby Death Match: The Rep (Dave McCall and Nate Carter) def. Murder By Kicks (Ken Broadway and Matt Travis)
Fans Bring The Weapons Match: Matt Tremont def. Mance Warner

First round
Doors Of Death Match: Dan O'Hare def. SHLAK
Summer Funtime Death Match: Conor Claxton def. Jimmy Chondo Lyon
Shattered Dreams Panes Of Glass Death Match: Jimmy Lloyd def. John Wayne Murdoch
Bundles and Boards Death Match: Casanova Valentine def. Big F'n Joe

Round two
Exploding Bat and Light Tubes Death Match: Conor Claxton def. Jimmy Lloyd
Texas Tangled Web Death Match: Dan O'Hare def. Casanova Valentine

Finals
 Light Tube Madness Death Match: Conor Claxton def. Dan O'Hare

See also
IWA Mid-South King of the Deathmatch

External links

CZW Official Website
CZW Results

References 

Professional wrestling tournaments
Combat Zone Wrestling shows
Recurring events established in 2002